Strictly Dance Fever is a British television programme, broadcast on BBC One on Saturday evenings. It was an amateur dance talent competition, hosted by Graham Norton, which ran during Spring 2005 and Spring 2006. It had 2 extra shows, The Saturday night BBC Three host was Zoe Ball and the nightly BBC3 roundup & fanzine program was hosted by Joe Mace. It was, in many ways, similar to the BBC's popular Strictly Come Dancing, a celebrity based dance contest also broadcast on Saturday evenings. On 12 December 2006, the BBC announced that Strictly Dance Fever had been axed in favour of the Andrew Lloyd Webber talent search, How Do You Solve a Problem Like Maria?.

Dances
The following dances have been performed in Strictly Dance Fever:

Couple dances
The Boogie Woogie (Series 1 Only)
 Salsa (Series 2) and specifically the Cuban Salsa (Series 1)
 The Argentine Tango (Series 1 and 2)
 The Hustle (Series 1 and 2)
 The Charleston (Series 1 and 2)
 The Lambada (Series 1 and 2)
 The Guapacha (Series 2 Only)
 The Flamenco (Series 2 Only)
 The American Smooth (Series 2 Only)
The Lindy Hop (Series 1 and 2)
 The Jitterbug (Series 1 and 2)
 The Foxtrot (Series 1 Only)
The Mambo (Series 1 Only)
The Milonga (Series 1 and 2)
 A movie routine (Series 1 Only)
The Waltz (Series 1 Only)
Rock 'n' Roll (Series 2 Only)
Adagio (Series 1 and 2)
Freestyle (Series 1 and 2)

Group dances
The Fosse
Street dance
Line dancing
Hand Jive
Big Apple
Disco
Can Can

Series 1
(broadcast in Spring 2005)

Judges
Choreographers: 
Stacey Haynes
Arlene Phillips,
Luca Tommassini
Jason Gardiner

Vocalists
Tommy Blaize
Lance Ellington
Andrea Grant
Tara McDonald

Contestants
In order of elimination:
Dan Gregory & Michelle Sheehan
Alex Shindila & Katie Gleeson
Toby Beal & Casey Morris
Paul Crook & Natasha Hall
Adam Spencer & Rebecca Leonard
Cem Ahmet & Gemma Stoddard
Nathan Potter & Kristy Cullen
James McClauchlan & Claire Adam
Danny Last & Jodie Binstead
Joseph Hall & Sadie Flower (winners)

Judges' scoring summary
Bold scores indicate the highest for that week. Red indicates the lowest score. * means this couple was in the bottom 2. IN means they did not dance due to an injury.

Dance chart

Average Chart
This chart is based on the dancers' averages and not their place in the competition.

Series 2

Judges

Choreographers: Stacey Haynes and Arlene PhillipsDancers: Wayne Sleep, and Ben Richards

Contestants
In order of elimination:

Clive Uter & Helga Helgdottier
Rob Glover & Dawn Nelson
Stewart Mills & Clare Roberts
Paul Culshaw & Aravon McCann
Paul Maguire & Pamela Smith
Mark Williamson & Jennifer Mistri
JP Omari & Stacey Gaunt
Ben Harrold & Stephannie Croxson (third)
Darren Bailey & Lana Williams (second)
Darrien Wright & Hollie Robertson (winners)

Judges' scoring summary
Bold scores indicate the highest for that week. Red indicates the lowest score.

Dance chart

Average Chart
This chart is based on the dancers' averages and not their place in the competition.

Broadcasting
Strictly Dance Fever was normally broadcast during BBC One's Spring schedule. The auditions ran for two weeks. The recalls ran for two weeks as in the auditions. Finally, the dance-offs, ran for eight weeks, this time though live. The final edition aired in June, where the ultimate winning couple was revealed.

Trivia

The maximum score for one dance, 40 points, has been achieved seven times throughout the series. Danny Last and Jodie Binstead (series 1 twice), Joseph Hall and Sadie Flower (series 1 once), Darren Bailey and Lana Williams (series 2 once) and then to Darrien Wright and Hollie Robertson (series 2 three times). Additionally, in the semi final of series 2 Darren Bailey and Lana Williams were awarded a perfect 30 out of 30, when Stacey Haynes was ill. The lowest score achieved was 12, by Paul James Culshaw and Aravon McCann (series 2 once).

See also
 Strictly Come Dancing

References

External links

Strictly Dance Fever at Unreality TV
Title Music: Banks & Wag
"Rob Glover" – Official Website
Learn Strictly Dance Fever
Strictly Dance Fever – JP Om (fansite)

2005 British television series debuts
2006 British television series endings
BBC Television shows
British reality television series
Dance competition television shows